California's 76th State Assembly district is one of 80 California State Assembly districts. It is currently represented by Democrat Tasha Boerner Horvath of Encinitas.

District profile 
The district encompasses coastal North County, stretching from Marine Corps Base Camp Pendleton in the north to Encinitas in the south. The district is relatively affluent and military-centered.

San Diego County – 15.1%
 Camp Pendleton North
 Camp Pendleton South
 Carlsbad
 Encinitas
 Oceanside
 Vista

Election results from statewide races

List of Assembly Members 
Due to redistricting, the 76th district has been moved around different parts of the state. The current iteration resulted from the 2011 redistricting by the California Citizens Redistricting Commission.

Election results 1992 - present

2020

2018

2016

2014

2012

2010

2008

2006

2004

2002

2000

1998

1996

1994

1992

See also 
 California State Assembly
 California State Assembly districts
 Districts in California

References

External links 
 District map from the California Citizens Redistricting Commission

76
Government of San Diego County, California